Correcto were a Scottish rock supergroup consisting of Paul Thomson (drummer) of Franz Ferdinand, Patrick Doyle (bassist) of The Royal We/Veronica Falls, Danny Saunders (vocals) and Richard Wright (guitarist).

Discography

Albums 
 Correcto (2008 · Domino Records)

Singles 
 Joni (2007 · Domino Records)
 Do It Better (2008 · Domino Records)

External links 
 Correcto at Discogs
 Correcto on Myspace
 Correcto at Last.fm
 Correcto Fans Myspace of fans

Scottish rock music groups
Musical groups from Glasgow